The 1983–84 NBA season was the Mavericks' 4th season in the NBA.

The season is notable seeing the Mavericks make the postseason for the first time in franchise history. However, after defeating the Seattle SuperSonics in the opening round, Dallas was outmatched by an experienced Los Angeles Lakers squad as they fell in five games.

Mark Aguirre was selected to play in the 1984 NBA All-Star Game. He is the first player in Mavericks history to be named an All-Star.

Draft picks

Roster

Regular season
The Mavericks started the season 11–0 at home.

Season standings

z – clinched division title
y – clinched division title
x – clinched playoff spot

Record vs. opponents

Game log

|- align="center" bgcolor="#ccffcc"
| 6
| November 5, 1983
| Los Angeles
| W 107–102
|
|
|
| Reunion Arena
| 4–2
|- align="center" bgcolor="#ffcccc"
| 7
| November 9, 1983
| @ Los Angeles
| L 106–120
|
|
|
| The Forum
| 4–3

|- align="center" bgcolor="#ccffcc"
| 16
| December 2, 1983
| @ Los Angeles
| W 133–118
|
|
|
| The Forum
| 12–4
|- align="center" bgcolor="#ffcccc"
| 30
| December 30, 1983
| Boston
| L 109–114 (OT)
|
|
|
| Reunion Arena
| 16–14

|- align="center"
|colspan="9" bgcolor="#bbcaff"|All-Star Break
|- style="background:#cfc;"
|- bgcolor="#bbffbb"

|- align="center" bgcolor="#ffcccc"
| 64
| March 9, 1984
| Los Angeles
| L 120–121 (2OT)
|
|
|
| Reunion Arena
| 34–30
|- align="center" bgcolor="#ffcccc"
| 73
| March 28, 1984
| @ Boston
| L 107–114
|
|
|
| Boston Garden
| 39–34

|- align="center" bgcolor="#ccffcc"
| 81
| April 13, 1984
| @ Los Angeles
| W 104–103
|
|
|
| The Forum
| 43–38

Playoffs

|- align="center" bgcolor="#ccffcc"
| 1
| April 17, 1984
| Seattle
| W 88–86
| Mark Aguirre (20)
| Mark Aguirre (11)
| Brad Davis (10)
| Reunion Arena17,007
| 1–0
|- align="center" bgcolor="#ffcccc"
| 2
| April 19, 1984
| Seattle
| L 92–95
| Rolando Blackman (28)
| Mark Aguirre (17)
| Rolando Blackman (7)
| Reunion Arena17,007
| 1–1
|- align="center" bgcolor="#ffcccc"
| 3
| April 21, 1984
| @ Seattle
| L 94–104
| Rolando Blackman (27)
| Jay Vincent (10)
| Rolando Blackman (5)
| Seattle Center Coliseum10,229
| 1–2
|- align="center" bgcolor="#ccffcc"
| 4
| April 24, 1984
| @ Seattle
| W 107–96
| Mark Aguirre (29)
| Aguirre, Vincent (11)
| Brad Davis (8)
| Kingdome11,893
| 2–2
|- align="center" bgcolor="#ccffcc"
| 5
| April 26, 1984
| Seattle
| W 105–104 (OT)
| Rolando Blackman (29)
| Jay Vincent (10)
| Rolando Blackman (8)
| Moody Coliseum9,007
| 3–2
|-

|- align="center" bgcolor="#ffcccc"
| 1
| April 28, 1984
| @ Los Angeles
| L 91–134
| Mark Aguirre (16)
| Kurt Nimphius (10)
| Davis, Turner (4)
| The Forum13,512
| 0–1
|- align="center" bgcolor="#ffcccc"
| 2
| May 1, 1984
| @ Los Angeles
| L 101–117
| Rolando Blackman (27)
| Dale Ellis (8)
| Mark Aguirre (5)
| The Forum15,298
| 0–2
|- align="center" bgcolor="#ccffcc"
| 3
| May 4, 1984
| Los Angeles
| W 125–115
| Rolando Blackman (31)
| Pat Cummings (14)
| Davis, Harper (6)
| Reunion Arena17,007
| 1–2
|- align="center" bgcolor="#ffcccc"
| 4
| May 6, 1984
| Los Angeles
| L 115–122 (OT)
| Mark Aguirre (34)
| Aguirre, Vincent (7)
| Blackman, Aguirre (6)
| Reunion Arena17,007
| 1–3
|- align="center" bgcolor="#ffcccc"
| 5
| May 8, 1984
| @ Los Angeles
| L 99–115
| Rolando Blackman (25)
| Dale Ellis (10)
| Brad Davis (6)
| The Forum16,644
| 1–4
|-

Player statistics

Season

Playoffs

Awards and records
 Mark Aguirre, NBA All-Star Game

Transactions

References

See also
 1983–84 NBA season

Dallas Mavericks seasons
Dal
Dallas
Dallas